Linepithema flavescens is a species of ant in the genus Linepithema. Described by William Morton Wheeler and Mann in 1914, the species is endemic to Haiti.

References

Dolichoderinae
Hymenoptera of North America
Insects described in 1914